Ibrahim Farhan Al-Zawahreh (born January 17, 1989) is a Jordanian footballer who is a defender for Al-Faisaly. He is a member of the Jordan national football team.

International career
Although he joined his country's national senior team in 2009 and was one of the members of Jordan who went to Doha to participate in the 2011 Pan Arab Games, Al-Zawahreh played first international match against Uzbekistan in an international friendly in Amman on 13 August 2012, which Jordan lost 1-0.

International goals

U-23

Senior Team
Scores and results list Jordan's goal tally first.

International career statistics

Honors
Al-Faisaly
AFC Cup (1): 2006
Jordan Premier League (3): 2009–10, 2011–12, 2016–17
Jordan FA Cup (3): 2007–08, 2011–12, 2016–17
Jordan Super Cup (2): 2006, 2012
Jordan FA Shield (2): 2009, 2011

References

External links 

Ibrahim Al-Zawahreh at Eurosport.com

1989 births
Living people
Jordanian footballers
Jordan international footballers
Association football defenders
Expatriate footballers in Saudi Arabia
Expatriate footballers in Qatar
Expatriate footballers in Kuwait
Jordanian expatriate sportspeople in Saudi Arabia
Jordanian expatriate sportspeople in Kuwait
Jordanian expatriate footballers
Footballers at the 2010 Asian Games
Sportspeople from Amman
Khaleej FC players
Al Ahli SC (Doha) players
Al-Fahaheel FC players
Al-Faisaly SC players
Saudi Professional League players
Asian Games competitors for Jordan
Kuwait Premier League players